Leslie is a surname and given name, derived from the name of Clan Leslie. The name derives from a placename in Aberdeenshire, perhaps an anglicisation of an originally Gaelic  "holly-garden". In the United Kingdom, the name is spelled Leslie when given to boys, while for girls it is usually rendered as Lesley.

Notable people and characters with the name include:

Given name

Female 
 Leslie (singer) (born 1985), French pop-R&B singer
 Leslie Cohen Berlowitz (1944–2020), American academic
 Leslie Bibb (born 1974), American actress
 Leslie Caron (born 1931), French actress
 Leslie Carrara-Rudolph, American puppeteer, also known as Abby Cadabby, on Sesame Street
 Leslie Carter (1986–2012), American pop/rock singer
 Mrs. Leslie Carter (1857–1937), American stage actress
 Leslie Cheng, American mathematician
 Leslie Erganian, American artist
 Leslie Feist (born 1976), Canadian singer
 Leslie Fish, American musician and songwriter
 Lesley Gore (1946–2015), American singer, songwriter, actress, and activist
 Leslie Hogben, American mathematician
 Annette "Leslie" Jones (born 1967), American comedian and actress
 Leslie Ann Jones, American recording engineer
 Leslie Mahaffy (1976–1991), Canadian homicide victim
 Leslie Mann (born 1972), American actress
 Lesley Manville (born 1956), English actress
 Leslie Marshall (journalist), American journalist
 Leslie Marshall (writer), American novelist, magazine editor and journalist
 Leslie "Sam" Phillips (born 1962), American singer and songwriter
 Leslie Pope (1954–2020), American set decorator
 Lesley Stahl (born 1941), American television journalist
 Lesley Sharp (born 1960), English stage, film, and television actress
 Leslie Silva (born 1968), American actress
 Leslie Crocker Snyder (born 1942), American lawyer and former judge
 Leslie Uggams (born 1943), American actress
 Leslie Van Houten (born 1949), American murderer and member of the Manson Family
 Lesley Ann Warren (born 1946), American actress

Male 
 Les Aspin (1938–1995), American politician
 Leslie Banks (1890–1952), English actor
 Leslie Benzies (born 1971), Scottish video game producer and former president of Rockstar North
 Leslie Bohem (born 1951), screenwriter who wrote Dante's Peak and Taken, among others
 Leslie Cauchi, backup singer with The Del-Satins and Johnny Maestro & the Brooklyn Bridge
 Leslie Charteris (1907–1993), half-Chinese, half-English author of primarily mystery fiction
 Leslie Cheung (1956–2003), Hong Kong actor-singer 
 Leslie Edward "Les" Claypool (born 1963), lead vocalist and bassist in the band Primus
 Leslie Cochran (1951–2012), vagrant cross-dresser of Austin, Texas
 Leslie Claudius (1927–2012), Indian Olympic hockey player
 Leslie Crowther (1933–1996), English comedian and TV presenter
 Leslie Duncan (1880–1952), Australian journalist and politician
 Leslie J. Edhlund (1911–1994), American mechanical engineer and politician
 Les Ferdinand (born 1966), English footballer
 Leslie Frazier (born 1959), American NFL head coach and former player
 Les Gleadell (1921–2009), Falkland Islands civil servant
 Leslie Groves (1896–1970), American general in command of the Manhattan Project
 Leslie Bob Hope (1903–2003), born Leslie Townes Hope, British-born American actor-comedian
 Leslie Howard (actor) (1893–1943), British actor
 Leslie Howard (musician) (born 1948), Australian pianist and composer
 Leslie Mervyn Jayaratne, Sri Lankan Sinhala judge, author, 2nd Governor of Southern Province, Sri Lanka
 Leslie Peter Johnson (born 1930), English philologist
 Leslie Jones (disambiguation), several people
 Leslie Jordan (1955–2022), American actor
 Leslie Lamport (born 1941), American computer scientist
 Les Locke (1934–c. 1996), Scottish footballer with Queens Park Rangers
 Leslie Khoo Kwee Hock, Singaporean convicted murderer and life convict
 Leslie Lynch King, Jr. (1913–2006), birth name of 38th U.S. President Gerald Ford
 Leslie Manigat (1930–2014), President of Haiti
 Les Miles (born 1953), American college football coach and former player
 Leslie Miller (disambiguation), several people
 Les Mills (born 1934), New Zealand track and field athlete and politician
 Leslie Moonves (born 1949), President and CEO of CBS
 Leslie Nielsen (1926–2010), Canadian-American actor and comedian
 Leslie Odom Jr. (born 1981), American actor and singer
 Leslie O'Neal (born 1964), American football player
 Leslie Parnas (1931–2022), American musician
 Leslie Phillips (1924–2022), English actor
 Leslie Pridgen (born 1978), American rapper who goes by the name of Freeway
 Leslie Sears (1901–1992), English cricketer
 Leslie Stephen (1832–1904), English author and critic
 Leslie Thomas (1931–2014), British author
 Leslie Valiant (born 1949), British computer scientist
 Leslie L. Westin (1917–1985), American businessman, educator, and politician
 Leslie West (1945–2020), American musician
 Les Wexner (born 1937), American businessman, founder of L Brands 
 Leslie D. Zettergren (born 1943), American biomedical researcher
 Leslie Patrick Bailey (1953–1993), British serial killer and member of the 'Dirty Dozen'

Surname 

 Alan M. Leslie, Scottish psychologist 
 Alexander Leslie, Earl of Ross (died 1402) 
 Alexander Leslie, 1st Earl of Leven (c.1580–1661)
 Alexander Leslie of Auchintoul (died 1663)
 Andrew Leslie (Canadian Army officer) (born 1957), Canadian Forces general and politician
 Andrew Leslie (shipbuilder) (1818–?), Scottish shipbuilder
 Andrew Leslie, 5th Earl of Rothes (died 1611), Scottish nobleman
 Ann Leslie (born 1941), British journalist
 Austin Leslie (1934–2005), New Orleans chef
 Bethel Leslie (1929–1999), American actress and screenwriter
 Cameron Leslie (born 1990), New Zealand paralympics gold medal winner
 Charles Leslie (nonjuror) (1650–1722), British Jacobite nonjuror and controversialist
 Charles Leslie (priest) (1718–1781), Irish Anglican priest
 Charles Robert Leslie (1794–1859), American genre painter
 Chris Leslie (born 1972), British Labour Co-operative Member of Parliament for Shipley and for Nottingham East
 Chris Leslie (musician) (born 1956), English electric folk musician 
 Conor Leslie (born 1991), American actress
 David Leslie, 1st Lord Newark (c. 1600–1682), Scottish Civil War general
 David Leslie (Oregon politician) (c. 1797–1869), American missionary and pioneer in Oregon
 David Leslie (racing driver) (1953–2008), Scottish Touring Car racing driver
 Delroy Leslie (born 1970), Jamaican boxer
 Desmond Leslie (1921–2001), Irish writer and film-maker
 Donald Leslie, (1911–2004), American musician, created and manufactured the Leslie speaker
 Edgar Leslie (1885–1976), American songwriter, lyricist, charter member of ASCAP
 Edward Leslie (born 1957), American professional wrestler
 Frank Leslie (1821–80), English-American publisher of Frank Leslie's Weekly
 Frank Leslie (Medal of Honor), American Civil War Medal of Honor recipient
 Franklyn Leslie (C. 1848 – c. 1930), western gunfighter
 Frederick W. Leslie (born 1951), NASA payload specialist
 George Dunlop Leslie (1835–1921), English artist
 Henry David Leslie (1822–1896), English composer and conductor
 Jim Leslie (journalist) (1937–1976), American public relations executive
 Jim Leslie (businessman) (1922–2012), Australian businessman
 Joan Leslie (1925–2015), American actress
 John Leslie (disambiguation), several people
 Jordan Leslie (born 1991), American football player
 Lawrie Leslie (born 1935), Scottish footballer
 Lew Leslie (1886–1963), Broadway producer
 Lisa Leslie (born 1972), American basketball player
 Martin Leslie (Australian footballer) (born 1962), Australian rules footballer
 Martin Leslie (rugby union) (born 1971), New Zealand rugby union player
 May Sybil Leslie (1887–1937), British chemist
 Megan Leslie, a Member of Parliament in the riding of Halifax, Nova Scotia
 Melanie Leslie, dean of the Benjamin N. Cardozo School of Law
 Michael Leslie (born 1993), Scottish snooker player
 Michael Leslie (dancer), Indigenous Australian dancer and choreographer
 Miriam Leslie (1828–1914), American publisher, author, and suffragist, wife of Frank Leslie
 Patrick Leslie (1815–1881), early settler in Australia
 Preston Leslie (1819–1907), governor of Kentucky (1871–75)
 R. Conrad Leslie, American businessman
 Robert Stanley Leslie, WW2 War Veteran
 Rose Leslie (born 1987), Scottish actress
 Ryan Leslie (born 1978), American record producer and singer
 Shane Leslie, Sir John Randolph Leslie, 3rd Baronet (1885–1971) 
 Sheila Leslie (born 1955), American politician
 Stefan Leslie (born 1987), Canadian soccer player
 Steve Leslie (footballer, born 1976), Scottish footballer
 Steve Leslie (footballer, born 1987), Scottish footballer
 Thomas Edward Cliffe Leslie (1825–1882), Irish economist
 Walter Leslie, Lord of Ross (died 1382)
 Walter Leslie (field marshal) (1607–1667), Imperial Field Marshal
 William Leslie (disambiguation) or Bill Leslie, several people

Fictional characters 
 Leslie Burke, the female protagonist of the Katherine Paterson novel Bridge to Terabithia
 Leslie Crambottom, a character In the American sitcom Silver Spoons
 Leslie Lynnton, the socialite played by Elizabeth Taylor in the 1956 film Giant
 Lieutenant Leslie, a character from Star Trek, played by Eddie Paskey
  Leslie "Jake" Ryan (Hannah Montana), a recurring character on the Disney Channel program Hannah Montana, played by Cody Linley
 Leslie Chow, Chinese character in The Hangover
 Leslie Knope, the main character on the NBC sitcom Parks and Recreation, played by Amy Poehler
 Leslie Winkle, a recurring character on the CBS sitcom The Big Bang Theory, played by Sara Gilbert
 Leslie, a flower from The Amazing World of Gumball, a Cartoon Network British animated series
 Leslie Meyers, a character in South Park
 Nurse Leslie, a character in Camp Lazlo
 Leslie Withers, a character from the survival horror video game The Evil Within
 Leslie P. Lilylegs, an antagonist in the Looney Tunes
 Leslie Kyle, a character in the video game, Final Fantasy VII Remake, and the novel, Final Fantasy VII The Kids Are Alright: A Turks Side Story, voiced by Mark Whitten
 Lesley is a playable character in the mobile game Mobile Legends: Bang Bang
 Captain Leslie Hero, a main character from the adult animated television sitcom Drawn Together and a lecherous parody of Superman and other superheroes
 Leslie Vernon, the main character of the 2006 horror-comedy "Behind the Mask: The Rise of Leslie Vernon", played by Nathan Baesel
 Leslie Noodman, a character from Sanjay and Craig
 The Great Leslie, a character played by Tony Curtis in the 1965 film The Great Race

See also 
 Leslie (disambiguation)
 Lesley (disambiguation)
 Tropical Storm Leslie – tropical cyclones named Leslie

References 

English feminine given names
English-language feminine given names
English-language masculine given names
English masculine given names
English unisex given names
English-language unisex given names
English-language surnames
Scottish unisex given names